Krasny Altay is a rural locality (a settlement) in Tsentralny Selsoviet, Rodinsky District, Altai Krai, Russia. The population was 416 as of 2013. There are 3 streets.

Geography 
Krasny Altay is located 34 km south of Rodino (the district's administrative centre) by road. Tsentralnoye is the nearest rural locality.

References 

Rural localities in Rodinsky District